The Japanese immigrant village in Taiwan was established during the Japanese colonial period between 1895 and 1945. The purpose of establishing this village was to provide suitable land for the Japanese immigrant to settle in Taiwan. The land that the government intended to establish as immigrant villages was to undergo a land and forestry survey to verify the land was vacant and assess its suitability to act as immigrant village land. The immigrant villages could be divided as privately conducted or publicly conducted. It could also be divided by occupation, a majority being farming immigrants, but also with fishing, mining, forestry and industrial immigration. The total number of Japanese immigrants during the colonial period was 500,000 people.

Background 
There were several reasons why the government had promoted “assimilation immigration” and established the immigration village for Japanese. First and the primary aim was to adjust the surplus population, in order to solve the limited farming resources in Japan; Secondly, to consolidate Japanese domination, for assimilation and the purpose of national defence; Lastly, develop preparation for Japan moving into tropical areas.
The immigration was divided into four major periods. The initial privately conduct immigration period in 1895–1908, where the first immigrant village was established; The publicly conduct period by the Karenkō Prefecture in 1909–1917, which introduced around 1700 immigrants into Eastern Taiwan; The privately conduct period by Taitō Prefecture in 1917–1932, where the immigrants mainly settled in Taitung (台東); The later publicly conduct immigration period in 1932–1945, had its development based in Western Taiwan. 
When the Japanese colonial rule ended in October 1945, all the Japanese immigrants were sent back to Japan with limitation on the sources they could bring home. For example, one set of winter and summer clothing, one blanket and cash no more than 1000 Yen.

The Main immigrant villages

Kata Immigrant Village 
In 1899, the Japanese entrepreneur Katakinsaburou (賀田金三郎) privately recruited immigrants to move to Taiwan. The Kata immigrant village (賀田移民村), established in Wuquan City (吳全城) of modern-day Hualien County, was not only the first immigrant village established in Eastern Taiwan, but also the first Japanese immigrant village in the world. There are around 133 families and 385 residences in Kata immigrant village. However, due to its geographic location and its private administrated nature, it did not gain the trust of others. Yet, immigrants could not sustain enough for self-sufficiency and caused deaths and returns. Hence, The first period of the Japanese Immigration was not so successful.

Yoshino Immigrant Village 
This is the first publicly conduct immigrant village in 1909, when the government had started to actively promote the immigration process. The Yoshino Immigrant Village (吉野移民村) was found in Hualien qijiao creek (花蓮七腳川), where sugarcane were the main production of the location. This location was originally the land of a group of aboriginals (阿美族). For the purpose of promoting immigration, the government provided three years of free medical service, free land usage as well as discounts on various expenses. The government also built clinics, primary schools, Japanese shrines and other public faculties.

The Life of the immigrants 
The Japanese immigrant villages are designed as how the original Japanese villages are like. The houses were made with bamboo and wood with a layer of hay as the roof. Tatami mats were also covered over the floor. The immigrants’ main productions were tobacco, sugar and rice. In order to increase the income of the immigrants, the Japanese government imported tobacco leaves for the immigrants to plant. They can then sell the tobacco leaves to the tobacco factories and earn income. Since Eastern Taiwan is the land of sugarcane, the immigrants also planted sugarcane and produced sugar with it. Lastly, Yoshino immigrant village once produced “Yoshino rice”, which it was the only rice Japanese emperor had used.

The heritages of the immigrant village 
Although all Japanese immigrants were sent back to Japan when the Japanese colonial rule ended, several immigrant villages still exists. Such as the Yoshino immigrant village, Toyota immigrant village (豐田移民村) and Hayashita immigrant village(林田移民村). Yet, these villages are open for public to examine the cultural heritages left during the Japanese colonial rule.

Taiwan under Japanese rule